Thomas Wesley McDade is an American biological anthropologist.  He is a Fellow of the American Association for the Advancement of Science, the National Academy of Sciences, and the American Academy of Arts and Sciences.

Early life and education
McDade was born in Des Plaines, Illinois and graduated from Pomona College with a degree in biosocial anthropology. Following this, he completed his PhD in anthropology from Emory University and postdoctoral fellowship at the Carolina Population Center.

Career
Upon completing his fellowship, McDade joined the faculty at Northwestern University (NU), in 2000. Early in his tenure at NU, McDade was the recipient of an Presidential Early Career Award for Scientists and Engineers for "undertaking important research that may ultimately improve child health through a better understanding of the social and environmental factors that affect the development of the human immune system." Following this, McDade developed a minimally invasive finger-prick technique to study the connections between stress and health problems. He used this technique to examine bio-markers in populations in Samoa, Kenya, and Bolivia.  McDade later became the director of the Laboratory for Human Biology Research and of Cells to Society (C2S): The Center on Social Disparities and Health, as well as the director of the Graduate Cluster in Society, Biology, and Health. As such, he was elected a Fellow of the American Association for the Advancement of Science.

At the start of the COVID-19 pandemic, McDade collaborated with Feinberg investigators, Richard D’Aquila, Brian Mustanski and Elizabeth M. McNally, to develop an at-home COVID-19 antibody test that can determine prior exposure to the SAR-CoV-2 virus using a drop of blood. Later, he received a grant for his project "A bio-ecological integrative approach to understand the ‘hidden costs’ of COVID-19 on children." In June 2020, McDade applied his at-home COVID-19 antibody test towards another project titled "Screening for Coronavirus Antibodies in Neighborhoods." The aim of the study was to test antibodies amongst pre-exposed Chicagoans. As a result of his research, McDade was elected to the American Academy of Arts and Sciences and National Academy of Sciences.

References

External links

Living people
American anthropologists
People from Des Plaines, Illinois
Emory University alumni
Pomona College alumni
Northwestern University faculty
Fellows of the American Association for the Advancement of Science
Fellows of the American Academy of Arts and Sciences
Members of the United States National Academy of Sciences
Year of birth missing (living people)